Nazrul Islam is a Bangladesh Nationalist Party politician and the former Member of Parliament of Jessore-4.

Career
Islam was elected to parliament from Jessore-4 as a Bangladesh Nationalist Party candidate in February 1996.

References

Bangladesh Nationalist Party politicians
Living people
6th Jatiya Sangsad members
Year of birth missing (living people)